The GNO Multitasking Environment, also known as GNO/ME or GNO for short, is a Unix-like operating system for the Apple IIGS computer. It was developed by Procyon Enterprises and sold commercially from 1991 through August 1996, when it was released as freeware. Development continued by Devin Reade, who released the current version 2.0.6 on 15 February 1999. The source code has since been released via GitHub.

References

External links
 
 Current version (via FTP)

Discontinued operating systems